The Trafford Centre is a tram stop built for Greater Manchester's Metrolink light rail system, built to serve passengers boarding and alighting at the Trafford Centre on the Trafford Park Line. Previously known as intu Trafford Centre, the tram terminus received the name The Trafford Centre after intu ceased ownership of the shopping centre, the tram stop's namesake. The stop is located adjacent to Barton Dock Road between Ellesmere Circle and Bright Circle.

History

In 2013, the Greater Manchester Combined Authority and the Greater Manchester Local Enterprise Partnership announced it may fund the construction of the Trafford line as far as Trafford Centre Metrolink station using the Earnback mechanism of the Greater Manchester City Deal, estimating that the line could be open to passengers by 2018/19 (subject to a satisfactory business case, Transport and Works Act Order and public consultation).

The Metrolink stop at the Trafford Centre was endorsed by former owner intu Properties, and is located along a new line routed from Pomona. An alternative route to this proposed stop also featured in Salford City Council's unitary development plan (2004–2016), whereby Metrolink would be expanded to the Trafford Centre from Eccles Interchange via the A57 road at Barton-upon-Irwell. It opened on 22 March 2020.

Following the administration of the intu Group, the shopping centre was renamed to drop references to its former owner in November 2020. Online references to the stop were altered to The Trafford Centre in January 2021.

Layout
The Trafford Centre received approval for a new covered walkway to connect the shopping centre to the tram stop, which has been completed ready for the start of passenger service.

Services
From this stop a service runs generally every 12 minutes towards Cornbrook.

There are plans to extend the line to Crumpsall on the Bury line, when this is to be done is unknown.

References

Bibliography

Tram stops in Trafford
Railway stations in Great Britain opened in 2020